The King Is Dead may refer to:

 The King Is Dead (album), the sixth studio album by The Decemberists
 "The King Is Dead" (Family Guy), the seventh episode of the second season of Family Guy
 The King Is Dead!, a 2012 Australian film
 The King Is Dead (novel), a novel that was published in 1951 by Ellery Queen
 "The King Is Dead" (Go West song), on the 1987 album Dancing on the Couch
 "The King Is Dead" (Tony Cole song), 1972
 The King Is Dead (TV series), a British comedy show created, written by and starring Simon Bird
 The king is dead, long live the king!, a traditional proclamation made following the accession of a new monarch
 "The King Is Dead But The Queen Is Alive", a song by American singer Pink on Japanese edition of The Truth About Love

See also
 "King's Dead", a song by Jay Rock, Kendrick Lamar and Future with James Blake from the Black Panther soundtrack
 The Queen Is Dead (disambiguation)